Benjamin Robert Clark (August 5, 1939 – April 4, 2007) was an American film director, screenwriter, producer, and actor. He is best known for his work in the Canadian film industry throughout the 1970s and 1980s, where he was responsible for some of the most successful films in Canadian film history such as Black Christmas (1974), Murder by Decree (1979), Tribute (1980), Porky's (1981), and A Christmas Story (1983). He won three Genie Awards (two Best Direction and one Best Screenplay) with two additional nominations. He and his son were killed by a drunk driver in April 2007.

Early life and education
Clark was born in New Orleans in 1939, but grew up in Birmingham, Alabama, and later moved to Fort Lauderdale, Florida. He grew up poor, as his father died during his childhood and his mother was a barmaid. After attending Catawba College majoring in philosophy, Clark won a football scholarship to Hillsdale College in Michigan, where he played quarterback. Eventually he studied theater at the University of Miami, turning down offers to play professional football. He did briefly play semi-pro for the Fort Lauderdale Black Knights.

Career
Clark's career began with She-Man: A Story of Fixation (1967) featured in a gender-bender double feature. Then transitioned into the horror genre in the early 1970s. His first film, Children Shouldn't Play with Dead Things (1972), was a blend of comedy and graphic horror.

Clark and his collaborator for this film, screenwriter and makeup artist Alan Ormsby, would revisit the zombie subgenre in 1972's Deathdream, also known by its alternative title, Dead of Night, a Vietnam War allegory that takes its cue from the classic short story "The Monkey's Paw". The slasher film Black Christmas (1974) was one of his most successful films in this period, and is remembered today as an influential precursor to the modern slasher film genre. Clark had moved to Canada, then a tax haven for Americans, and these Canuxploitation productions were small by Hollywood standards but made Clark a big fish in the small pond of the Canadian film industry of that era.

Clark executive-produced the moonshine movie Moonrunners, which was used as source material for the TV series The Dukes of Hazzard. Clark later produced the 2000 TV movie The Dukes of Hazzard: Hazzard in Hollywood. Clark and others sued Warner Bros. over the studio's 2005 movie The Dukes of Hazzard, winning a $17.5 million settlement just prior to the movie's release.

Turning toward more serious fare, Clark scored a critical success with the Sherlock Holmes film Murder by Decree, starring Christopher Plummer and Geneviève Bujold, which won five Genie Awards including Best Achievement in Direction and Best Performance for both leads. He followed this with a movie of the Bernard Slade play Tribute, starring Jack Lemmon reprising his Broadway role, for which Lemmon was nominated for an Academy Award and 11 Genies including a win for Lemmon's performance.

Clark returned to his B-movie roots, though, co-writing, producing, and directing Porky's, a longtime personal project. Clark had a detailed outline based on his own youth in Florida, which he dictated into a cassette recorder due to illness, and collaborator Roger Swaybill said of listening to the tapes, "I became convinced that I was sharing in the birth of a major moment in movie history. It was the funniest film story I had ever heard." Though set in the United States, the film would go on to gross more than any other English-language Canadian film.  The film was the third most successful release of 1982 and by the end of the film's lengthy initial release, in 1983, Porky's had secured itself a spot, albeit short-lived, as one of the top-25 highest-grossing films of all time in the US. The film was (also briefly) the most successful comedy in film history. The overwhelming success of Porky's is credited as launching the genre of the teen sex comedy so prevalent throughout the 1980s, and which continued into the millennium in such films as the American Pie series. Clark wrote, produced, and directed the film's first sequel, Porky's II: The Next Day (1983), which did not feature the title character, and introduced two new antagonists with perhaps greater relevance, a blustering fundamentalist preacher, and a sleazy local politician who cynically caters to his influence, while seducing a teenage girl. Clark refused involvement with a third film, Porky's Revenge!, which brought Porky and the sexual exploits of the cast back front and center as in the first installment, as well as bringing everything full-circle and bringing the gang's high school rowdy escapades to a close.

He instead collaborated with Jean Shepherd on A Christmas Story, which critic Leonard Maltin described as "one of those rare movies you can say is perfect in every way". Although not a box-office smash in its theatrical release, A Christmas Story would go on to become a perennial holiday favorite via repeated TV airings and home video. A joint effort at a sequel in 1994, My Summer Story, did not fare as well; Maltin said that the studio waited too long, and Clark was forced to recast almost the entire film. Three other film versions of the Parker family had been produced for television by PBS with Shepherd's involvement during the late 1980s, also with a different cast, but without Clark's participation.

Clark continued to stay active in the film industry until his death, with lower-budget fare mixed in with brief runs at higher targets. A The Hollywood Reporter critic, speaking after his death, described his career as "a very unusual mix of films", because he "at times was a director-for-hire and would do films that, to say the least, aren't stellar". Some of his last output included Baby Geniuses and Superbabies: Baby Geniuses 2.

Clark was nominated twice for the Razzie Awards as "Worst Director", for Rhinestone and Superbabies: Baby Geniuses 2. At the end of his life, he was working with Howard Stern on a remake of Porky's, and, with Black Christmas having been remade, two of his other early horror films were slated for expensive remakes: Children Shouldn't Play With Dead Things and Deathdream.

Clark was divorced, and had two sons, Michael and Ariel.

Death
Clark and his younger son, Ariel Hanrath-Clark, 22, were killed in a head-on car crash on the Pacific Coast Highway in Pacific Palisades, Los Angeles on the morning of April 4, 2007. The crash occurred when an SUV crossed the median and struck Clark's Infiniti I30, causing the closure of the highway for eight hours. Police determined that the SUV's driver, Héctor Manuel Velázquez-Nava, had a blood alcohol level of three times the legal limit and was driving without a license. Velázquez-Nava was described by federal authorities as an illegal alien. The driver initially pleaded not guilty to two counts of gross vehicular manslaughter, but changed his plea to no contest in August, and was sentenced to six years in prison under the terms of a plea agreement on October 12, 2007.

Filmography

Film

Television

References

External links

 
Canadian Film Encyclopedia [A publication of The Film Reference Library/a division of the Toronto International Film Festival Group]
Canuxploitation interview Canuxploitation Interview: Bob Clark

1939 births
2007 deaths
American male screenwriters
American expatriates in Canada
Comedy film directors
Horror film directors
Catawba College alumni
Best Director Genie and Canadian Screen Award winners
Hillsdale College alumni
Hillsdale Chargers football players
Male actors from Fort Lauderdale, Florida
Male actors from New Orleans
Road incident deaths in California
University of Miami alumni
Best Screenplay Genie and Canadian Screen Award winners
Fort Lauderdale High School alumni
Film directors from Florida
Writers from New Orleans
Musicians from Fort Lauderdale, Florida
Writers from Fort Lauderdale, Florida
20th-century American musicians
Screenwriters from Florida
Screenwriters from Louisiana
Film producers from Florida
Film producers from Louisiana
20th-century American male writers
20th-century American screenwriters